Scholtzia teretifolia is a shrub species in the family Myrtaceae that is endemic to Western Australia.

It blooms between October and January producing pink-white flowers.

It is found on sandplains and floodplains along the west coast in the Wheatbelt region of Western Australia between Carnamah and Gingin where it grows in sandy soils.

References

teretifolia
Plants described in 1867